Waidmannslust is a German locality (Ortsteil) within the borough (Bezirk) of Reinickendorf, Berlin.

History
The locality was created in 1875 as a Villenkolonie. In 1920 it merged in the city of Berlin with the Greater Berlin Act. During 1949–1990 it was part of the French sector of West Berlin.

Geography

Overview
Situated in the north-western suburb of Berlin, not too far from Tegel's forest and lake, it borders the localities of Hermsdorf, Lübars, Wittenau and Tegel.

Subdivision
The locality is subdivided into 2 zones (Ortslagen):
 Schwarzwald-Siedlung (Rollberge Siedlung)

Transport
The locality is served by S-Bahn, at Berlin Waidmannslust station, on S1, S26 and S85 lines.

It is also served by A 111 motorway, at the exit n.4, named "Waidmannsluster Damm/Hermsdorfer Damm".

Personalities
 Elga Brink (1905–1985), actress
 Marlies Wanjura (b. 1945), former mayor of Reinickendorf borough

References

Literature
Klaus Schlickeiser: "Waidmannslust, Vom Wirtshaus zum Ortsteil Reinickendorfs" - Berlin 2000, 
Manfred Mendes: "Leben in Waidmannslust, Geschichten, Episoden, Berichte, Bilder" -  Mendes Eigenverlag, Berlin 2004

External links

 Waidmannslust official website
 Waidmannslust page of Reinickendorfer site

Localities of Berlin